Live is a live album by American guitarist Leo Kottke, released in 1995. It includes two of Kottke's signature monologues ("Combat", "Roy Autry"), giving a small taste of the complete concert experience. A previously unreleased song "Flattened Brain" is also included.

Reception

Writing for Allmusic, music critic Murrday Fisher wrote of the album "... as is characteristic of his style, it's his instrumental work on cuts like "Peg Leg," "Little Martha," and a mellow version of the old classic "Twilight Time" that show the artist in peak form... Definitely recommended."

Track listing
All songs by Leo Kottke except as noted.
 "William Powell" – 5:32
 "The Room at the Top of the Stairs" (Randall Hylton) – 2:47
 "Airproofing" – 4:50
 "Jack Gets Up" – 4:49
 "Combat" - 6:05
 "Peg Leg" – 2:21
 "Twilight Time" (Buck Ram, Morty Nevins, Al Nevins) – 2:27
 "Bean Time" – 1:40
 "Roy Autry" – 6:25
 "Parade" – 4:11
 "I Yell at Traffic" – 5:40
 "Flattened Brain" – 3:45
 "Little Martha" (Duane Allman) – 2:04
 "Oddball" – 3:18
 "Arms of Mary" (Ian Sutherland) – 4:08

This is just to note that many of the track timings are incorrect as printed on the cover and reproduced here. The primary example is "Roy Autry," which is only 0:49, not 6:25. Total album time is 53:14, not 60:02.

Personnel
Leo Kottke - acoustic guitar, vocals
Production notes:
Produced by Leo Kottke & Paul duGre

References

External links
 Leo Kottke official site
 Unofficial Leo Kottke web site (fan site)

Leo Kottke live albums
1995 live albums